Royal College Building can refer to:

Royal College Building, Colombo, Sri Lanka is the oldest building of Royal College Colombo.
Royal College Building, Glasgow, Scotland, UK is the oldest building of John Anderson Campus of University of Strathclyde.
Old Royal College Building, Colombo, Sri Lanka; (1911) oldest building at the University of Colombo

See also
 Royal College (disambiguation)